Transactions of the American Neurological Association  was an American journal published between 1875 and 1981. It covered the field of neurology.

See also 
 American Neurological Association

References 
 National Library Of Medicine

Publications established in 1875
Publications disestablished in 1981
Neurology journals